Roommates is a 2006 South Korean film and the third installment of the 4 Horror Tales film series, all with different directors but with the same producer; Ahn Byeong-ki.

Plot
Roommates Yoo-jin, Eun-soo, Bo-ram, and Da-young are cramming for a college entrance exam. It's difficult for them to adapt to the stifling atmosphere of the all female lodging institute and to get along with each other, due to their differing personalities. Yoo-jin has the most difficulty with the stuffy institute life. She begins to have visions of events that took place at the institute in the past, such as the tragic fire that occurred years ago. Yoo-jin gradually becomes consumed with fear, and the relationship among the four begins to suffer with dangerous results.

Cast

 Jung-in Choi as Assistant Teacher 
 Kim Joo-Ryung as Teacher No.2
 Eun-seong Lee as Kim Bo-ram
 Yeong-jin Sin
 Da-kyung Yoon as Housemother
 Jin-yong Heo
 Young-Sun Kim as Park Soon-Ok
 Kim Ri-na
 Ho-rin Yoo

External links
 
 
 

2006 films
2006 horror films
South Korean horror films
2000s Korean-language films
2000s South Korean films